Stanhope  is a market town and civil parish in the County Durham district, in the ceremonial county of Durham, England. It lies on the River Wear between Eastgate and Frosterley, in the north-east of Weardale. The main A689 road over the Pennines is crossed by the B6278 between Barnard Castle and Shotley Bridge. In 2001 Stanhope had a population of 1,633, in 2019 an estimate of 1,627, and a figure of 1,602 in the 2011 census for the ONS built-up-area which includes Crawleyside. In 2011 the parish population was 4,581.

Civil parish

The civil parish includes the settlements of Cornriggs, Cowshill, Daddry Shield, Eastgate, Frosterley, Ireshopeburn, Lanehead, St John's Chapel, Wearhead and Westgate, all on the A689 road, and also Bollihope, Bridge End, Brotherlee, Copthill, Crawleyside, East Blackdene, Hill End, Lintzgarth, New House, Rookhope and West Blackdene. Other places it includes are Killhope, Shittlehope, Unthank and White Kirkley. This gives it the largest parish area in England, at 221 km2. It has some land in common with the neighbouring Wolsingham civil parish. On 31 December 1894 "Stanhope Urban" parish was formed from part of Stanhope parish, but on 1 April 1937 it was merged back. On 1 April 1946, 2,396 acres (969.6 ha) were transferred to the parish from Wolsingham.

Description
Stanhope is surrounded by moorland in the North Pennines Area of Outstanding Natural Beauty (AONB) – the second largest of a current 40 such areas in England and Wales. Features of interest include:
A petrified tree stump standing in the churchyard was found with two others, one of which features in the Great North Museum in Newcastle upon Tyne.
The Durham Dales Centre incorporates a tea room, tourist information and craft shops.
Stanhope Bridge, a scheduled monument, was built in the 15th century and widened in 1792.
The ford has a stepping-stone bridge for pedestrians.
The 18th-century Stanhope Castle in the town centre stands on the possible site of a medieval castle. It was built in 1798 by Cuthbert Rippon, MP for Gateshead.
The town has one of only two heated open-air swimming pools in the North East.

Stanhope was at the centre of the Weardale campaign (1327), when Sir James Douglas of Scotland invaded England and faced Edward III and Roger Mortimer, earl of March. A series of skirmishes took place on the valley floor and in Stanhope Park.

The parish church dedicated to St Thomas is mostly from the 12th–13th centuries, with restoration in 1663 and 1867. The earliest known Rector was Richardus in 1200. Joseph Butler, later Bishop of Bristol, was Rector in 1725.

Stanhope Castle may be on the site of a motte and bailey castle according to some evidence from the 1790s. Furthermore, Bishop Anthony Bek granted land "to the west side of Stanhope castle". The present castle was built for Cuthbert Rippon (1744-1801) in 1798 with additions in 1823 by his son, also Cuthbert (1797–1867) and Member of Parliament for Gateshead. Ignatius Bonomi (1787–1870) was the architect. In 1941 the castle was adapted by the Home Office as a school for boys and remained so until 1980, where it was converted into apartments. Part of the gardens lie to the north of the castle across the main road, including the park wall and gazebo.

Stanhope Agricultural Show is held on the second weekend of September each year. It has been held annually since 1834, except in world-war years, the 2001 United Kingdom foot-and-mouth outbreak foot and mouth crisis, and times of bad weather.

Weardale Railway
Stanhope is the current terminus of the Weardale Railway, a heritage line operating mainly at weekends from Bishop Auckland, with stations at Frosterley, Wolsingham and Witton-le-Wear. Stanhope Station stood in for the fictional Partlington Station in an episode of the criminal drama series Vera.

Notable residents
In order of birth:
Joseph Butler (1692–1752), theologian and cleric
William Greenwell (1820–1918), archaeologist and Anglican cleric, catalogued Late Bronze Age finds at Heathery Burn Cave near Stanhope in 1859–1872.
William Percival Crozier (1879–1944), scholar and journalist, edited the Manchester Guardian in 1932–1944.
Muriel Young (1923–2001), television continuity announcer, presenter and producer, died in Stanhope.

Gallery

See also
Battle of Stanhope Park

References

External links

 
Market towns in County Durham
Civil parishes in County Durham